Jakarta Elektrik PLN is an Indonesian men's volleyball club owned and managed by the Perusahaan Listrik Negara that plays at the Proliga. The club won the 2015 Proliga championship.

Honours
Proliga
Champions (1): 2015

References

Indonesian volleyball clubs
Volleyball clubs established in 2004